The Strata Management Act 2013, is a Malaysian laws which enacted to provide for the proper maintenance and management of buildings and common property, and for related matters.

Preamble
WHEREAS it is expedient for the purposes only of ensuring uniformity of law and policy with respect to local government to make laws relating to the maintenance and management of buildings and common property within Peninsular Malaysia and the Federal Territory of Labuan

Structure
The Strata Management Act 2013, in its current form (8 February 2013), consists of 11 Parts containing 153 sections and 4 schedules (including no amendment).
 Part I: Preliminary
 Part II: Administration of the Act
 Part III: Dealings in Building or Land Intended for Subdivision into Parcels
 Part IV: Strata Management before Existence of Management Corporation
 Chapter 1: General
 Chapter 2: Management by developer before joint management body is established
 Chapter 3: Management by joint management body
 Chapter 4: Miscellaneous provisions applicable to this Part
 Chapter 5: Transitional and saving provisions due to the repeal of the Building and Common Property (Maintenance and Management) Act 2007
 Part V: Strata Management after Existence of Management Corporation
 Chapter 1: General
 Chapter 2: Management by developer before first annual general meeting of management corporation
 Chapter 3: Management by developer after first annual general meeting of management corporation
 Chapter 4: Subsidiary management corporation and limited common property 
 Chapter 5: Miscellaneous provision applicable to this Part
 Chapter 6: Transitional and saving provisions due to consequential amendments to the Strata Titles Act 1985
 Part VI: Managing Agent
 Part VII: Deposit to Rectify Defects
 Part VIII: Insurances
 Part IX: Disputes and Strata Management Tribunal
 Chapter 1: General
 Chapter 2: Establishment and organization
 Chapter 3: Jurisdiction of Tribunal
 Chapter 4: Conduct of proceedings
 Chapter 5: Awards of Tribunal
 Chapter 6: Miscellaneous provisions applicable to this Part
 Part X: Enforcement
 Part XI: Miscellaneous
 Schedules

Management responsibilities 
The developer is responsible to maintain and manage the building intended for strata title subdivisions during the first year after vacant possession (developer's management period). Within that one year, the developer shall call for an Annual General Meeting of all proprietors, during which, the Joint Management Body (JMB) is formed. The JMB comprises the proprietors and the developer. The Committee members appointed by the proprietors during the General Meeting and the developer forms the Joint Management Committee (JMC). The JMC acts on behalf of the JMB who has the responsibility to maintain and manage the building pending the issuance of individual strata titles. After strata titles are issued by the Land Office, the developer is responsible to call for the first Annual General Meeting of the Management Corporation. The Corporation appoints its Committee members during the General Meeting known as the Management Committee (MC). The Management Corporation and the Management Committee do not include the developer.

References

External links
 Strata Management Act 2013 
 Effect of the New Strata Management Act 2013 on Upcoming Strata Developments, Adzman Shah Mohd Ariffin

2013 in Malaysian law
Malaysian federal legislation